Mohamed El-Malky Ragheb (Native name:محمد المالكي راغب, born 23 July 1953) is an Egyptian wrestler. He competed in the men's Greco-Roman 48 kg at the 1972 Summer Olympics.

References

1953 births
Living people
Egyptian male sport wrestlers
Olympic wrestlers of Egypt
Wrestlers at the 1972 Summer Olympics
Place of birth missing (living people)
20th-century Egyptian people